Ratna Jit Tamang (born 1 January 1993) is a Nepalese badminton player. He was born in badminton family. His father Dan Bahadur Tamang was a former national player, and his sister Nangsal and Sara Devi also play badminton in the international event. In 2016, he became the first Nepalese that won the international tournament in Pakistan together with Nangsal in the mixed doubles event.

Achievements

South Asian Games 
Men's singles

BWF International Challenge/Series (1 title, 2 runners-up) 
Men's doubles

Mixed doubles

  BWF International Challenge tournament
  BWF International Series tournament
  BWF Future Series tournament

References

External links 
 

Living people
1993 births
People from Bhojpur District, Nepal
Nepalese male badminton players
Badminton players at the 2010 Asian Games
Badminton players at the 2014 Asian Games
Badminton players at the 2018 Asian Games
Asian Games competitors for Nepal
South Asian Games bronze medalists for Nepal
South Asian Games medalists in badminton
Tamang people